The Europe/Africa Zone was one of the three zones of the regional Davis Cup competition in 1990.

In the Europe/Africa Zone there were two different tiers, called groups, in which teams compete against each other to advance to the upper tier. The winner in the Europe Zone Group II advanced to the Europe/Africa Zone Group I in 1991.

Participating nations

Draw

  promoted to Group I in 1991.

First round

Cyprus vs. Bulgaria

Second round

Bulgaria vs. Greece

Luxembourg vs. Poland

Turkey vs. Malta

Monaco vs. Norway

Third round

Poland vs. Bulgaria

Turkey vs. Norway

Fourth round

Poland vs. Norway

References

External links
Davis Cup official website

Davis Cup Europe/Africa Zone
Europe Zone Group II